In Canada, the 1955 Governor General's Awards for Literary Merit were the nineteenth such awards.  The awards in this period had no monetary prize but were an honour for the authors.

Winners
Fiction: Lionel Shapiro, The Sixth of June (filmed as D-Day the Sixth of June).
Poetry or Drama: Wilfred Watson, Friday's Child.
Non-Fiction: N.J. Berrill, Man's Emerging Mind.
Non-Fiction: Donald G. Creighton, John A. Macdonald, The Old Chieftain.
Juvenile: Kerry Wood, The Map-Maker.

External links
 

Governor General's Awards
Governor General's Awards
Governor General's Awards